The 1987 Labatt Canada Cup was a professional international ice hockey tournament held from August 28 to September 15, 1987. The finals took place in Montreal on September 11 and Hamilton, on September 13 and September 15, and were won by Team Canada.

The final best-of-three series of this tournament between Canada and the Soviet Union is considered by many to be the best exhibition of hockey in history. At the time, Soviet players were not allowed to pursue playing careers in North America, and so it was only through tournaments like this one where hockey fans could see them exhibit their skills head-to-head against the best of the National Hockey League (NHL). The United States and Soviet Union teams complained about the neutrality of the officiating in the tournament. Soviet coach Viktor Tikhonov said he felt the main reason his team lost was because of "bias and errors in refereeing."

The tournament also was the only time that two of the most dominant NHL players of all time, Wayne Gretzky and Mario Lemieux, played on the same forward unit, combining with each other on 29% of Team Canada's goals. The winning Canadian team had 12 future Hockey Hall of Fame members on the roster.

Rosters

Canada
Forwards and defence: Dale Hawerchuk, Mark Messier, Mike Gartner, Glenn Anderson, Kevin Dineen, Michel Goulet, Brent Sutter, Rick Tocchet, Brian Propp, Doug Gilmour, Claude Lemieux, Mario Lemieux, Wayne Gretzky, Doug Crossman, Craig Hartsburg, Normand Rochefort, James Patrick, Raymond Bourque, Larry Murphy, Paul Coffey
Goaltenders: Ron Hextall, Kelly Hrudey, Grant Fuhr
Coaches: Mike Keenan, John Muckler, Jean Perron, Tom Watt

Czechoslovakia
Forwards and defence: Petr Rosol, Igor Liba, Jan Jasko, Jiri Kucera, Jiri Dolezal, Vladimir Ruzicka, Ladislav Lubina, David Volek, Petr Vlk, Dusan Pasek, Jiri Sejba, Jiri Hrdina, Rostislav Vlach, Miloslav Horava, Drahomír Kadlec, Ludek Čajka, Bedřich Ščerban, Jaroslav Benák, Antonin Stavjana, Mojmir Bozik
Goaltenders: Petr Briza, Dominik Hašek, Jaromir Sindel
Coaches: Dr. Ján Starší, František Pospíšil

Finland
Forwards and defence: Timo Blomqvist, Jari Grönstrand, Matti Hagman, Raimo Helminen, Iiro Järvi, Timo Jutila, Jari Kurri, Markku Kyllonen, Mikko Mäkelä, Jouko Narvanmaa, Teppo Numminen, Janne Ojanen, Reijo Ruotsalainen, Christian Ruuttu, Jukka Seppo, Ville Siren, Petri Skriko, Raimo Summanen, Esa Tikkanen, Hannu Virta
Goaltenders: Jarmo Myllys, Kari Takko, Jukka Tammi
Coaches: Rauno Korpi, Juhani Tamminen

Sweden
Forwards and defence: Tommy Albelin, Mikael Andersson, Peter Andersson, Jonas Bergqvist, Anders Carlsson, Thom Eklund, Anders Eldebrink, Peter Eriksson, Bengt-Åke Gustafsson, Tomas Jonsson, Lars Karlsson, Mats Näslund, Kent Nilsson, Lars-Gunnar Pettersson, Magnus Roupé, Thomas Rundqvist, Tommy Samuelsson, Håkan Södergren, Peter Sundström, Michael Thelvén
Goaltenders: Anders Bergman, Åke Lilljebjörn, Peter Lindmark
Coaches: Tommy Sandlin, Curt Lindström, Ingvar Carlsten

United States
Forwards and defence: Joe Mullen, Curt Fraser, Corey Millen, Aaron Broten, Kelly Miller, Mark Johnson, Bob Brooke, Wayne Presley, Pat LaFontaine, Bobby Carpenter, Ed Olczyk, Joel Otto, Chris Nilan, Dave Ellett, Mike Ramsey, Kevin Hatcher, Rod Langway, Phil Housley, Gary Suter, Chris Chelios
Goaltenders: Tom Barrasso, Bob Mason, John Vanbiesbrouck
Coaches: Bob Johnson, Ted Sator, Doug Woog

USSR
Forwards and defence: Vyacheslav Fetisov, Alexei Gusarov, Igor Stelnov, Vasily Pervukhin, Alexei Kasatonov, Anatoli Fedotov, Igor Kravchuk,  Yuri Khmylev, Vladimir Krutov, Andrei Lomakin, Igor Larionov, Valeri Kamensky, Andrei Khomutov, Sergei Svetlov, Alexander Semak, Sergei Nemchinov, Sergei Makarov, Vyacheslav Bykov, Anatoly Semenov
Goaltenders: Vitali Samoilov, Sergei Mylnikov, Evgeny Belosheikin
Coaches: Viktor Tikhonov, Igor Dmitriev

Round robin standings

Game scores

Round-robin

Semi-finals

Final (best of three)

Three closely fought 6–5 games decided the '87 Canada Cup.

In Game 1, Canada erased a 4–1 second period deficit to send the game to overtime, only to lose on Alexander Semak's goal at 5:33 of the extra frame.

In Game 2, which is considered by some to be the greatest hockey game ever played, Canada led 3–1 after one period, but this time it was the Soviets who came from behind to tie it 3–3 in the second.  Canada scored twice more, each time Mario Lemieux assisted by Wayne Gretzky, but the Soviets replied each time.  The tying goal was an end-to-end rush by Valeri Kamensky with 1:04 remaining in regulation time.  After a scoreless period of overtime, which featured tremendous goaltending from Grant Fuhr, Gretzky and Lemieux hooked up for the third time of the evening at 10:07 of the second overtime.  It was the fifth assist for Gretzky on the night and completed a hat trick for Lemieux.

The Canadians got off to a slow start in the decisive third game.  The Soviets scored three times in the first eight minutes to take a 3–0 lead.  Canada's grinders took over after that (particularly Rick Tocchet, Brent Sutter, and Dale Hawerchuk), and pulled Canada into a 5–4 lead after two periods.  The Soviets tied it back up in the third and the game looked like it would head to overtime again.  But late in the third period, Canada coach Mike Keenan, who had been juggling lines all series, sent the trio of Gretzky, Lemieux and Hawerchuk out to play with a faceoff in Canada's end. After Hawerchuk won the faceoff, Gretzky, Lemieux and Larry Murphy rushed up the ice. Soviet defenseman Igor Stelnov was the only man back and he fell down to block a pass across but Gretzky fed the puck back to Lemieux, who fired a shot over the glove of goaltender Sergei Mylnikov with 1:26 remaining. The Gretzky to Lemieux play is one of the most memorable plays in Canadian sports history.

Stat leaders

Points

Goals

Assists

PIM

Goaltender wins

Goaltender Save Percentage

minimum 120 minutes played

Goaltender Goals Against Average

minimum 120 minutes played

All numbers in bold represent that was tournament high

Trophies and awards

Tournament champion
Canada

Tournament MVP
Wayne Gretzky, Canada

All-star team
Goaltender: Grant Fuhr, Canada
Defence: Ray Bourque, Canada; Viacheslav Fetisov, Soviet Union
Forwards: Wayne Gretzky, Canada; Mario Lemieux, Canada; Vladimir Krutov, Soviet Union

See also
Summit Series
Canada Cup
World Cup of Hockey

References

External links
Hockey Hall of Fame Tournament Summary
Hockey Canada Tournament Summaries
Canada Cup '87 – 99 & 66 perform pure magic
Canada Versus the Soviet Union: The Heyday of the Battle for World Hockey Supremacy (1972-1987)

1987
1987–88 in Canadian ice hockey
1987–88 in American ice hockey
1987–88 in Soviet ice hockey
1987–88 in Czechoslovak ice hockey
1987–88 in Finnish ice hockey
1987–88 in Swedish ice hockey
Sports competitions in Hamilton, Ontario
1987 in Ontario
August 1987 sports events in Canada
September 1987 sports events in Canada
20th century in Hamilton, Ontario